
Year 337 BC was a year of the pre-Julian Roman calendar. At the time it was known as the Year of the Consulship of Longus and Paetus (or, less frequently, year 417 Ab urbe condita). The denomination 337 BC for this year has been used since the early medieval period, when the Anno Domini calendar era became the prevalent method in Europe for naming years.

Events 
 By place 

 Greece 
 At a Pan-Hellenic Conference in Corinth, Philip II of Macedon announces the formation of the League of Corinth to liberate the Greek cities of Asia Minor from Persian rule, ostensibly because the Persian King, Arses, refuses to make reparations to Philip for Artaxerxes III's aid to the city of Perinthus when it was resisting Philip. All the Greek cities (except Sparta) and the Greek islands swear their support to the league and to recognise Philip as president of the League. Philip establishes a council of representatives from all the Greek states, which is empowered to deliberate and decide on the actions to be taken. However, the real power lies with Philip who is declared commander of the League's army.
 Olympias is put aside by her husband Philip II, following Philip's marriage to a girl named Cleopatra (who is renamed Eurydice). Their son, Alexander, is effectively disowned by Philip's actions. Philip II has Ptolemy, along with other companions of his son, exiled.

 Roman Republic 
 A plebeian is chosen to be praetor of Rome for the first time.

Births 
 Demetrius I Poliorcetes ("Besieger"), Antigonid dynasty king of Macedon (d. 283 BC)

Deaths 
 Timoleon, Greek statesman and general (b. c. 411 BC)
 Shen Pu-hai, Chinese bureaucrat, chief minister of Han

References